Lilly Williams is an American former Negro league infielder who played in the 1940s.

Williams played for the Philadelphia Stars in 1940 and 1941. In his ten recorded games, he posted eight hits and three RBI in 25 plate appearances.

References

External links
 and Seamheads

Year of birth missing
Place of birth missing
Philadelphia Stars players